Ameyo Stella Adadevoh (27 October 1956 – 19 August 2014) was a Nigerian physician.

She is credited with having curbed a wider spread of the Western African Ebola virus epidemic in Nigeria by placing the patient zero, Patrick Sawyer, in quarantine despite pressure from the Liberian government. When threatened by Liberian officials who wanted the patient to be discharged to attend a conference, she resisted the pressure and said, "for the greater public good" she would not release him. She is known for preventing the Nigerian index case from leaving the hospital at the time of diagnosis, thereby playing a key role in curbing the spread of the virus in Nigeria. On 4 August 2014, it was confirmed that she had tested positive for Ebola virus disease and was being treated. Adadevoh died in the afternoon of 19 August 2014. 
She was survived by her husband Afolabi and son Bankole among other relatives.

Early life and family 
Ameyo Adadevoh was born in Lagos, Nigeria in October 1956. She spent the majority of her life in Lagos. Her father and great-grandfather, Babatunde Kwaku Adadevoh and Herbert Samuel Macaulay, were both distinguished scientists.  Herbert Macaulay was one of the founders of modern Nigeria. Her grandfather was from the Adadevoh family of the Volta Region of Ghana, to which she was very much connected, though she lived in Lagos.  Her father Babatunde Kwaku Adadevoh was a physician and former Vice chancellor of the University of Lagos. She was also the grand niece of Nigeria's first president Nnamdi Azikiwe, as well as a great-great-granddaughter of Sara Forbes Bonetta and a great-great-great-granddaughter of Ajayi Crowther. Adadevoh worked at First Consultant Hospital where a statue of her great-grandfather exists.

Education 
Adadevoh went to preschool at the Mainland Preparatory Primary School in Yaba, Lagos (1961-1962). She spent two years in Boston, Massachusetts before moving back with her family to Lagos. She attended primary school at the Corona School, Yaba in Lagos, Nigeria (1964-1968), then the Queen's School, Ibadan (1969-1974) Nigeria for her secondary school education.

Medical education and career 
Adadevoh graduated from the University of Lagos  College of Medicine with a Bachelor of Medicine/Bachelor of Surgery. She served her one-year mandatory housemanship at Lagos University Teaching Hospital in 1981. She spent her residency at Lagos University Teaching Hospital and obtained her West African College of Physicians and Surgeons credential in 1983. She then went to London to complete her fellowship in endocrinology at Hammersmith Hospital. She spent 21 years at the First Consultants Medical Center in Lagos, Nigeria. There, she served as the Lead Consultant Physician and Endocrinologist.

Work with swine flu 
Adadevoh was the first to alert the Nigerian Ministry of Health when H1N1 spread to Nigeria in 2012.

Work with Ebola virus 
Adadevoh correctly diagnosed Liberian Patrick Sawyer as Nigeria's first case of Ebola at First Consultant Hospital in Lagos, Nigeria in July 2014. Adadevoh kept Sawyer in the hospital despite his insistence that he simply had a bad case of malaria. Sawyer wanted to attend a business conference in Calabar, Nigeria. Adadevoh led the team that oversaw Sawyer's treatment. Adadevoh also kept him at the hospital despite receiving a request from the Liberian ambassador to release him. She tried to create an isolation area, despite the lack of protective equipment, by raising a wooden barricade outside Sawyer's door. Her work saved Nigeria from widespread infection. At the time of these events, Nigerian doctors were on strike, which could have led to a severe health crisis. She also provided staff with relevant information about the virus, procured protective gear and quickly contacted relevant officials. As a result of her report, the Nigerian government declared a national public health emergency and the Nigerian Ministry of Health set up an Ebola Emergency Operations Center. WHO declared Nigeria to be Ebola-free on 20 October 2014.

Marriage and children 
Ameyo Adadevoh married Afolabi Emmanuel Cardoso on April 26, 1986. The couple had one son, Bankole Cardoso.

Death and legacy 
Adadevoh died from the Ebola virus in quarantine on 19 August 2014 in Lagos, Nigeria. Her body was decontaminated and cremated by the government. Her family obtained her ashes and held a private interment ceremony while upholding the funeral rights also on 12 September 2014, in Lagos. The Dr. Ameyo Adadevoh Health Trust (DRASA), a non-profit health organization, was created in her honour. The film 93 Days is dedicated to Adadevoh and tells the story of the treatment of Sawyer by Adadevoh and other medical staff at First Consultant Medical Center. The film was directed by Steve Gukas. On 27 October 2018, she was honoured with a Google Doodle posthumously on what would have been her 62nd birthday.

In February 2020, a road was named after Adadevoh in Abuja, Nigeria's capital city. The road "Ameyo Adadevo Way" is directly linked to Ahmadu Bello Way, one of Abuja's major and longest roads. This is one of the first efforts made by the Nigerian government to honour her valuable contribution to the country in the last weeks of her life.

Honors and awards

References

1956 births
2014 deaths
Nigerian women medical doctors
Alumni of the University of London
University of Lagos alumni
Azikiwe family
Yoruba women physicians
Adadevoh family
Deaths from Ebola
Physicians from Lagos
Infectious disease deaths in Nigeria
20th-century Nigerian medical doctors
Abiodun family
Nigerian humanitarians
Nigerian expatriates in the United States
Nigerian expatriates in the United Kingdom
Queen's School, Ibadan alumni
21st-century Nigerian medical doctors
20th-century Nigerian women
21st-century Nigerian women
20th-century women physicians
21st-century women physicians